N. T. R. Arts  is an Indian film production company in Banjara Hills, Hyderabad. Established by actor Nandamuri Kalyan Ram, it is named after his grandfather Nandamuri Taraka Rama Rao.

History
Nandamuri Kalyan Ram established the production house with the name of his grandfather, actor, and former Chief Minister of Andhra Pradesh, Nandamuri Taraka Rama Rao, known as 'NTR'. The production house has introduced directors such as Surender Reddy, Anil Ravipudi, and Mallidi Vassishta to Tollywood. Former film producer and politician, Nandamuri Janaki Ram, elder son of Nandamuri Harikrishna, was also a part of the banner until he died in a car accident, on December 6, 2014.

Film production

References

External links

Film production companies based in Hyderabad, India
Year of establishment missing